Mansurabad (also Romanized as Manşūrābād and Mansoor Abad; also known as Manaūrābād) is a village in Dehshir Rural District, in the Central District of Taft County, Yazd Province, Iran. At the 2006 census, its population was 25, in 11 families.

References 

Populated places in Taft County